Ethel Paley (October 8, 1920 Manhattan - November 18, 2019 Manhattan) was a social worker who advocated for nursing home patients and their families.

Biography
Paley was born Ethel Louise Schneider to Herman, a restaurateur and Ida, a homemaker.  They moved to Willimantic, Connecticut from Flushing, Queens during the Depression. She served in Washington, DC in 1943 as a member of the WAVES.  When she returned, she used the G.I. Bill to attend Barnard College, earning a bachelor’s degree in American history and economics I’m 1949. Her Master of Social Work, with a concentration in community organization, was from the Columbia University School of Social Work.

She was a long term (more than 60 years) resident of the West Village.

Career
After Barnard, Paley worked at the New York City Housing Authority and directed the school’s career office.

Paley founded the non-profit Friends and Relatives of the Institutionalized Aged (FRIA) in 1976 which operated until its bankruptcy in 2011. Paley was the first executive director. Her work led to the formation of Long Term Care Community Coalition (LTCCC).

Fria operated  a hotline, available in English and Spanish and staffed by social work students.

Awards and honors
Mario Cuomo presented Paley with the Governor’s Seniors of Distinction Award in 1994.  In 2010, she received the L'Oréal Women of Worth Award and inducted in the Columbia School of Social Work Hall of Fame in 2014.

References

1920 births
2019 deaths
Barnard College alumni
Columbia University School of Social Work alumni
WAVES personnel
American social workers
People from Willimantic, Connecticut
People from Flushing, Queens
Columbia University School of Social Work Hall of Fame Inductees